Tony Fagenson (born July 18, 1978) is a guitarist, producer, songwriter and multi-instrumentalist who is best known for his work with rock bands Eve 6 and Dead Posey.

Eve 6 
While attending the University of Southern California at the age of 18, he auditioned for a band from La Crescenta, California called Eleventeen (eventually to become Eve 6) to replace their drummer. A fan at the time of the Fox TV show The X-Files, Fagenson and singer Max Collins were inspired to name the band Eve 6 after seeing the X-Files episode "Eve" while recording their first album. Fagenson played on and co-wrote the four Eve 6 albums released between 1998 and 2012.

Fagenson announced his departure from Eve 6 via Instagram and Twitter on April 7, 2018 and is now full time playing in his band Dead Posey.

Producer and songwriter 
When not spending time on band matters, Fagenson produced and co-wrote songs for artists such as Puddle of Mudd, Emily Osment (of Disney's Hannah Montana), The Johnsons & Bryce Vine, Sandra N, Illustrated, Malbec etc. In 2005, Fagenson joined former Eve 6 member Max Collins in forming a new band, The Sugi Tap while Eve 6 was on hiatus.

Dead Posey 
In 2018, Fagenson started his current band Dead Posey as guitarist with partner Danyell Souza. The band has released 3 EP's on Sumerian Records / Position Music - Freak Show, Malfunction] & Malfunction X Broken Down The band has also released three new singles from their unreleased debut album - Russian Roulette, sorry i'm not dead and Can't Take Me Down.

Dead Posey  has played notable festivals Download, Louder Than Life, Aftershock and Shiprocked and toured with bands such as Theory of a Deadman and Palaye Royale with Bones UK.

Dead Posey's music has been heard in Fox's Lucifer, MTV's Teen Wolf, Marvel's Cloak & Dagger, and Netflix's Jack Whitehall: Travels With My Father, as well as in ads for Taco Bell, Sony PlayStation, Riot Games’ League of Legends, and more.  In 2019 their song "Don't Stop The Devil" was the theme song for WWE's Elimination Chamber. The band's song "Parasite" from the Malfunction EP made the 68 Best Rock Songs of 2020 by Loudwire. Dead Posey has received positive write ups from the likes of Spin, Guitar World, Kerrang! Magazine and has collaborated with Hot Topic on their "I Like Scary Movies Experience" feature. They have also appeared on podcasts such as The Boo Crew, The Fred Minnick Show and She Will Rock You. In June 2022 Dead Posey have made their debut on Kerrang! Radio's show Fresh Blood hosted by Alex Baker and were picked as The Featured Artist Of The Week.

Show One 
Fagenson is the co-creator of ShowOne, a mobile backing tracks app for musicians.

Personal life 
Fagenson is married to bandmate Danyell Souza (Dead Posey). He is the son of the Grammy Award winning producer Don Was.

References

American punk rock musicians
American record producers
1978 births
Living people
Eve 6
Harvard-Westlake School alumni
20th-century American drummers
American male drummers
21st-century American drummers